Daniela Ceccarelli (born 25 September 1975) is an Italian alpine skiing coach and former World Cup Alpine skier.

In 2002, she won a surprise gold medal in the Super-G competition in Salt Lake City. After her retirement, she started her own ski club, under the name Golden Team Ceccarelli, along with her family. She is the mother of the Albanian alpine skier Lara Colturi.

Biography

Daniela Ceccarelli in her 16 years of high-level competitive activity, from 1996 to 2010, conquered three podiums in World Cup races, two second places in Super-G and a third place in downhill, but her most important result it is undoubtedly the Olympic gold medal won at the 2002 Salt Lake City Winter Olympics. He has also won the Italian Alpine Ski Championships two times and various other podium finishes.

After her career as an athlete, she founded a ski team, the Golden Team Daniela Ceccarelli, in which she is also a coach and subsequently she also became technical commissioner of the Albanian national ski team for which nation she also competes the daughter Lara Colturi.

Until 2021 she was also a technical commentator for the ski races for the Italian RAI radio and television.

World Cup results

Season standings

Race podiums
 3 podiums - (1 DH, 2 SG)

National titles
Ceccarelli has won two national championships at individual senior level.

Italian Alpine Ski Championships
Super-G: 2002
Downhill: 2003

See also
 Italy national alpine ski team at the Olympics

References

External links
 
 
 

1975 births
Living people
Sportspeople from the Metropolitan City of Rome Capital
Italian alpine skiing coaches
Italian female alpine skiers
Alpine skiers at the 2002 Winter Olympics
Alpine skiers at the 2006 Winter Olympics
Olympic gold medalists for Italy
Olympic alpine skiers of Italy
Olympic medalists in alpine skiing
Medalists at the 2002 Winter Olympics
Alpine skiers of Fiamme Oro